Aguas Blancas is a small village located south of Lavalleja, Uruguay.
Aguas Blancas is an area of dam located at km 91 of the Map 8, is 28 km from the provincial capital Minas. You can access it via the Scenic Route Route 81. The dam was built on the waters of the Arroyo Mataojo, located in the Sierra del Abra de Zabaleta. Being a dam area is ideal for fishing and boating. It is a place visited on weekends to rest and enjoy nature. There is in place a municipal campsite with pitches, electricity, potable water, bathrooms with hot water, barbecue, washing clothes and dishes, bathing area, fishing, and boating on the lake. There are soccer and volleyball, storage, and security. In the area you can see wild goats and different types of birds. This site is located at a strategic point since you can get from Punta del Este on National Route Route 60 and Montevideo on National Route Map 8. It is near Solis Mataojo town with all the essential services. Also this place is in the mystical environment of Buddhist temple located on top of a hill, you can visit.

See also 
 Represa de Aguas Blancas

References 

Populated places in the Lavalleja Department